Paranomus dispersus, the long-head sceptre, is a flower-bearing shrub that belongs to the genus Paranomus and forms part of the fynbos. The plant is native to the Western Cape, South Africa.

Description

Fire destroys the plant but the seeds survive. The plant is bisexual and pollinated by insects. The fruit ripens, two months after flowering, and the seeds fall to the ground where they are spread by ants.

Distribution and habitat
The plant occurs from the Great Winterhoek Mountains to the Riviersonderend Mountains to the Outeniqua Mountains and Swartberg and Rooiberg.

Gallery

References

External links

dispersus